The 2009 Meydan FEI Nations Cup was the 2009 edition of the FEI Nations Cup, a premier international team Grand Prix show jumping competition run by the FEI and sponsored for the first time by the Meydan Group from Dubai. It was held at eight European venues from May 15 to August 17, 2009. After one year in the (old) FEI Nations Cup the team of France won the series in 2009.

2009 show schedule

Overall standings 

After the 2009 season Belgium and Great Britain both are tied on the eight place in final ranking. The rule book have no rule for this situation. The FEI decided, that Belgium, Great Britain and the tenth-placed team from Italy are relegated to the 2010 FEI Nations Cup Promotional League. The Great Britain Federation going to court because of this decision. In follow of this the Court of Arbitration for Sport (CAS) has allowed the appeal of the British Equestrian Federation. So ten teams are allowed to start in the 2010 Meydan FEI Nations Cup.

External links 
Official website

2009 in show jumping
Meydan FEI Nations Cup